David Magee (born 1962) is an American screenwriter who was nominated for a 2004 Academy Award and a Golden Globe for Finding Neverland. Along with Simon Beaufoy, he wrote the screenplay for Miss Pettigrew Lives for a Day starring Frances McDormand and Amy Adams, which was released in 2008.

His 2012 screen adaptation of the novel Life of Pi by Yann Martel earned him a Satellite Award for Best Adapted Screenplay and a nomination for the Academy Award for Best Adapted Screenplay.

He wrote the screenplay for the Disney musical Mary Poppins Returns, directed by Rob Marshall, and starring Emily Blunt and Lin-Manuel Miranda, which was released in 2018. He received the Humanitas Prize in the Best Family Film category for his screenplay.

Magee is writing an untitled musical about Hans Christian Andersen with Stephen Schwartz.

In March 2019, it was announced that Paramount Pictures would develop an animated film version of The Tiger's Apprentice by Laurence Yep from Magee's script adaptation of the book.

In May 2020, it was also announced that Paul Feig would direct an adaptation of The School for Good and Evil based on a script by Magee.

In 2021, Magee was tapped to adapt the controversial romance novel Lady Chatterly's Lover, with Emma Corrin set to star, Laure de Clermont-Tonnerre directing, helmed by 3000 Pictures and distributed by Netflix.

In January 2022, it was announced that Marc Forster would direct Tom Hanks in an American adaptation of Swedish novel A Man Called Ove (retitled A Man Called Otto) with a script penned by Magee.

Filmography
 Finding Neverland (2004)
 Miss Pettigrew Lives for a Day (2008)
 Life of Pi (2012)
 Mary Poppins Returns (2018)
 The School for Good and Evil (2022)
 A Man Called Otto (2022)
 Lady Chatterley's Lover (2022)
 The Little Mermaid (2023)
 The Tiger's Apprentice (2024)
 Untitled Hans Christian Andersen musical (TBA)

References

External links
 
 Brass Mantle Entertainment

1962 births
Living people
American male screenwriters
Michigan State University alumni